The FIL World Luge Championships 1985 took place in Oberhof, East Germany for the second time, having done so previously in 1973.

Men's singles

Women's singles

Men's doubles

Medal table

References
Men's doubles World Champions
Men's singles World Champions
Women's singles World Champions

FIL World Luge Championships
Sport in Oberhof, Germany
1985 in luge
1985 in German sport
Luge in Germany